The nineteenth season of The Bachelorette (also promoted as The Bachelorettes) premiered on July 11, 2022. This season features 26-year-old Rachel Recchia, a flight instructor from Clermont, Florida, and 31-year-old Gabby Windey, an ICU nurse from O'Fallon, Illinois.

Recchia and Windey were the co-runners-up on the 26th season of The Bachelor featuring Clayton Echard.

The season concluded on September 20, 2022, with Recchia accepting a proposal from 28-year-old general contractor Tino Franco. They broke up while the season was airing when it was revealed Franco cheated on her. During the live finale, runner-up Aven Jones asked Recchia on a date, and she said yes, but they decided not to pursue a relationship. Windey accepted a proposal from 29-year-old real estate analyst Erich Schwer, but their breakup was announced on November 4, 2022.

This is the third American edition of The Bachelorette to feature two leads following the eleventh and sixteenth seasons; however, unlike those seasons, this is the first American Bachelorette season to have both Bachelorettes co-lead the entire season. This has already occurred with the first season of The Bachelorette New Zealand featuring Lesina Nakhid-Schuster and Lily McManus, and the sixth season of The Bachelorette Australia featuring sisters Becky and Elly Miles.

Production

Casting and contestants 
On March 15, 2022, Recchia and Windey were announced as the Bachelorettes by Jesse Palmer during the After the Final Rose special of the 26th season of The Bachelor.

All contestants and crew members were required to be fully vaccinated from COVID-19 and hold a current vaccination passport to participate.

Notable contestants include NHRA drag racer Jordan Vandergriff, nephew of retired drag racer Bob Vandergriff Jr; Roby Sobieski, brother of former actress and artist Leelee Sobieski; Zach Shallcross, nephew of actor Patrick Warburton; and Kirk Bryant, assistant football coach at Texas Tech University.

Filming and development 
Former Bachelor Jesse Palmer was confirmed as the permanent host for the series, replacing interim hosts Tayshia Adams and Kaitlyn Bristowe. Filming began on March 26, 2022 at Villa de la Vina mansion in Agoura Hills, California, known as The Bachelor mansion and was the first The Bachelorette season to use this property since season 15 after the previous three seasons had altered due to the COVID-19 pandemic. With the locations being reported in France, Belgium, and the Netherlands onboard the Virgin Voyages Valiant Lady cruise ship across the English Channel and North Sea. Additionally, filming occurred at The Wildwoods in Wildwood, New Jersey on April 25, 2022, for Tyler Norris' hometown date with Recchia. With the final portion of filming taking place in Mexico and concluded in mid-May.

The season was delayed from its usual May start for the second time in three years to accommodate for ABC's coverage of the NBA Finals and Stanley Cup Finals.

The rose ceremonies are conducted differently than previous seasons. In week 2, the Bachelorettes alternated handing out roses, with each rose coming from both of them. From week 3 onwards, the contestants had to divide into two groups based on which Bachelorette they were pursuing. If a contestant rejected a rose from one of the Bachelorettes, he would return to the line and wait to see if he received a rose from the other Bachelorette. If he did not receive a rose from the second Bachelorette, he was eliminated.

Contestants 
35 potential contestants were revealed on March 23, 2022. 

The final cast of 32 men was announced on June 7, 2022. James Clarke was originally cast in season 16 featuring Clare Crawley, when filming of that season was due to start in March 2020. However, television productions were shut down due to the COVID-19 pandemic, and he was not called back for the rescheduled season in July 2020.

Future appearances

The Bachelor
Zach Shallcross was chosen as the lead for season 27 of The Bachelor.

Bachelor in Paradise 
Hayden Markowitz, Jacob Rapini, Joey Young, Johnny DePhillipo, Justin Young, Logan Palmer, and Tyler Norris returned for season 8 of Bachelor in Paradise. Markowitz and Rapini were eliminated week 4. Palmer split from Kate Gallivan in week 5. Joey and Justin split from Shanae Ankney and Florence Moerenhout, respectively, in week 6. Norris left in a relationship with Brittany Galvin in week 6. DePhillipo got engaged to Victoria Fuller in week 6.

Dancing with the Stars
Windey participated in season 31 of Dancing with the Stars where she partnered with Val Chmerkovskiy. They finished runner-up to Charli D'Amelio.

Call-out order 

 The contestant received a first impression rose
 The contestant received a rose from Rachel during a date
 The contestant received a rose from Gabby during a date
 The contestant was eliminated
 The contestant was eliminated during a date
 The contestant was eliminated outside the rose ceremony
 The contestant was medically removed from the competition
 The contestant moved on to the next week by default
 The contestant quit the competition
 The contestant won the competition
Explanatory notes

Controversy 

Contestant Erich Schwer faced controversy in September 2022 after photos of him posing with friends wearing Make America Great Again hats and wearing blackface in his high school yearbook emerged, with fans expressing frustration at ABC for casting yet another contestant with a racially insensitive past. On September 8, 2022, Schwer issued an apology for his actions.

Schwer was embroiled in further controversy when his ex-girlfriend came forward with allegations that he told her he was only going on the show for his career. Texts shared by her showed Schwer asking her to continue dating him because the show "isn't real", and he also allegedly sent her a bouquet of roses with a note saying "I'll never stop thinking of you" in the days before he left for filming. On the show's live finale, Schwer stated that he "used the show as an excuse to not confront her about our relationship." Windey further stated that Schwer had told her about the texts before they made their way online and that she had been "expecting them."

Episodes

Notes

References

External links 

 

2022 American television seasons
The Bachelorette (American TV series) seasons
Television series impacted by the COVID-19 pandemic
Television shows filmed in California
Television series set on cruise ships
Television shows filmed in France
Television shows filmed in Belgium
Television shows filmed in the Netherlands
Television shows filmed in New Orleans
Television shows filmed in Florida
Television shows filmed in New Jersey
Television shows filmed in Massachusetts
Television shows filmed in Mexico